Soriyampatti  is a village in Harur Taluk, in  Dharmapuri District, in the Tamil Nadu State of India.

References

External links

Villages in Dharmapuri district